The Končulj Agreement is a colloquial name for two statements, signed by the Liberation Army of Preševo, Medveđa and Bujanovac (UÇPMB) and the Republic of Serbia within FR Yugoslavia. The Končulj Agreement is the first agreement related to this part of Serbia (Preševo, Medveđa, and Bujanovac).

It resulted in the full demilitarization, demobilization, and disarmament of the Liberation Army of Presevo, Medveda, and Bujanovac. It also calls for integration of ethnic Albanians into governmental, civic, economic, and police structures, and support from the international community to implement the so-called Čović Plan.

The agreement ended the conflicts that spilled over from Kosovo, with political representatives from the local Albanians, Serbia, and Kosovo committing to demilitarization and demobilization of the UÇPMB. The agreement was witnessed by Sean Sullivan, who was the NATO Head of Office in the FRY. According to that agreement, the Yugoslav Army was to enter Sector B of the Ground Security Zone by 31 May 2001.

Background 

On June 12, 1999, one day after the end of the Kosovo War and the signing of the Kumanovo Agreement, the UÇPMB was founded by Shefket Musliu, an auto mechanic from Končulj, who was the highest commander in the UÇPMB. The UÇPMB attacked in the villages of Dobrošin and Konćulj. The UÇPMB attacked until the border with Macedonia and continued to go north until the end with the eastern border with Kosovo. 

The Yugoslav Army tried to take back some Serbian soldiers in Mid-November 2000, but they had to retreat following the kidnapping and killings of four policemen and two wounded policemen in the demilitarized zone, allowing the UÇPMB to take one of the serb-held pockets. 

Earlier in March 2001, NATO allowed Yugoslav forces to take back the Ground Safety Zone (GSZ) sector by sector in an attempt to decrease the amount of tense fighting between the ethnic Albanian separatists and MUP. In mid-May 2001, 400 UÇPMB forces surrendered to KFOR, supposedly ending the war, but it continued until June 1, 2001 when it officially ended. Low intensity skirmishes continued.

Provisions
The key provisions of the agreement were designed to do the following:

the full demilitarization, demobilization, and disarmament of the Liberation Army of Preševo, Medveđa, and Bujanovač (UÇPMB)
integration of ethnic Albanians into governmental, civic, economic and police structures, and support from the international community to implement the so-called Čovic Plan
stop the fighting in Preševo, Medveđa, and Bujanovac

References

2001 in Serbia